Guillermo Bárcena Blázquez (born 19 February 1994) is a Cuban footballer who currently plays as a defender.

Career statistics

Club

Notes

References

1994 births
Living people
Cuban footballers
Cuban expatriate footballers
Association football defenders
Segunda División B players
Tercera División players
Football League (Greece) players
CF Gavà players
A.E. Karaiskakis F.C. players
Cuban expatriate sportspeople in Spain
Expatriate footballers in Spain
Expatriate footballers in Greece